Sopiko Khukhashvili (born 4 January 1985) is a Georgian chess player. She holds the titles of International Master and Woman Grandmaster.

Khukhashvili won the Girls U16 section of the World Youth Chess Championships twice, in 1999 and 2000. She competed in the Women's World Chess Championship in 2010 and 2012. She reached the second round in 2010.

References

External links 
 
 
 Sopiko Khukhashvili games at 365Chess.com

1985 births
Living people
Chess International Masters
Chess woman grandmasters
World Youth Chess Champions
Female chess players from Georgia (country)
Place of birth missing (living people)